Isophrictis robinella is a moth of the family Gelechiidae. It was described by Pierre Chrétien in 1907. It is found in southern France.

The wingspan is about 15 mm.

Etymology
The species is named for the type locality, the Canal de la Robine in the Languedoc-Roussillon region of France.

References

Moths described in 1907
Isophrictis